In enzymology, a trimethyllysine dioxygenase (TMLH) is an enzyme that catalyzes the chemical reaction

N6,N6,N6-trimethyl-L-lysine + 2-oxoglutarate + O2  3-hydroxy-N6,N6,N6-trimethyl-L-lysine + succinate + CO2

TMLH is a member of the alpha-ketoglutarate-dependent hydroxylases superfamily. The 3 substrates of this enzyme are N6,N6,N6-trimethyl-L-lysine, 2-oxoglutarate, and O2, whereas its 3 products are 3-hydroxy-N6,N6,N6-trimethyl-L-lysine, succinate, and CO2.

This enzyme belongs to the family of oxidoreductases, specifically those acting on paired donors, with O2 as oxidant and incorporation or reduction of oxygen. The oxygen incorporated need not be derived from O2 with 2-oxoglutarate as one donor, and incorporation of one atom o oxygen into each donor.  The systematic name of this enzyme class is N6,N6,N6-trimethyl-L-lysine,2-oxoglutarate:oxygen oxidoreductase (3-hydroxylating). Other names in common use include trimethyllysine alpha-ketoglutarate dioxygenase, TML-alpha-ketoglutarate dioxygenase, TML hydroxylase, 6-N,6-N,6-N-trimethyl-L-lysine,2-oxoglutarate:oxygen oxidoreductase, and (3-hydroxylating).  This enzyme participates in lysine degradation and L-carnitine biosynthesis and requires the presence of iron and ascorbate.

See also
Carnitine biosynthesis
γ-Butyrobetaine hydroxylase
4-N-Trimethylaminobutyraldehyde dehydrogenase

References

 
 

Human 2OG oxygenases
EC 1.14.11
Iron enzymes
Ascorbate enzymes
Enzymes of unknown structure